Don't Flop Entertainment is one of the largest rap battle leagues based in the United Kingdom. It was founded by longtime friends Eurgh (Rowan Faife) and Cruger (Freddie Scott-Miller) in 2008. Since then, notable performers include Oshea, Sensa, Lunar C, Rizzle (of Rizzle Kicks), Tony D (of Poisonous Poets), Blizzard, Mercury Music Prize nominee Soweto Kinch, and Mark Grist. Several rappers from Don't Flop have also made appearances in the Canadian rap battle league King of the Dot, as well as youth and music broadcaster SB.TV. American rappers Illmaculate and Soul Khan have also made appearances on Don't Flop, both as rappers and judges.

Format
Don't Flop battles are usually three rounds, with each round being 60 to 90 seconds, although significant main event battles will sometimes have 3 minute rounds, there have also been instances of unlimited rounds. A coin flip typically decides who goes first, and the emcees alternate after each round. Sometimes however, the battlers will decide between themselves off camera who will go first, and in a championship match, the Champion will decide who goes first. A panel of 3-5 judges then decide the winner (there have been instances of a 7 judge format in title matches). Up until recently, an overtime round would settle a draw. However, this has now been removed from most leagues and a winner has to be decided after the 3 standard rounds.

Events
Don't Flop events are often divided across England. Mancunian rapper Chronicle organised Don't Flop North events To The Test 1 to 9, with Don't Flop co-founder, and London/Norwich based promoter and battle rapper Eurgh stepping in to organise the tenth event. A London rap battle event entitled "Blood in the Water" was thrown every year from 2009 to 2011. Emcees from other rap battle leagues such as Grindtime, King of the Dot, and Basementality Battles came to the UK to battle other opponents. Don't Flop held its first USA vs Canada battle in 2011 with Jonny Storm vs Charron. Today, there are a minimum of 2 events each month and are held all over the country.

Innovation
In recent times Don't Flop has led the way in introducing new forms of battling. In 2012, Don't Flop hosted its annual April Fools event. Here, many new formats of the written battle style were introduced. At the same event, Don't Flop also hosted its first ever 3-way battle. Then, at the "Second Quarter Try-Outs" event in Manchester, a battle which involved both rapping and guitar playing was showcased for the first time. Don't Flop has also shown innovation in the way battles are judged to ensure the right decision is made. Moving away from a traditional format, in the 2013 tag team tournament, judging was done after the event by judges that video their decision, which was then edited in to the battle video.
Also in mid 2015, Don't Flop introduced a new format of battling known as "Freestyle Royal Rumble", a format that has a non specific number of participants (that can be increased or decreased in the span of the rumble) all freestyling with & against one another in either a tag team or free for all objective.

List of Champions

Until 2012, there was no crowning achievement within Don't Flop. Many people thought that Oshea and Sensa were the two best battlers in the league. They battled once already, and planned to battle again for the title. Oshea defeated Sensa to become the league's first champion.

Since then the title has changed hands twice. Tony D, the second champion, is the only champion to successfully defend the title three times, subsequently relinquishing the title after the third defense. At Checkpoint 2, Soul and Cee Major battled for the vacant title, in which Soul won and became Don't Flop's third champion.

In 2016, Soul successfully defended his title against Raptor Warhurst. Soul was unsuccessful with his second title defense against Shox the Rebel.

Solo Champions

Doubles Champions

See also 

 Lord of the Mics

References

External links

 
Music competitions in the United Kingdom
British hip hop
2008 establishments in the United Kingdom